4341 Poseidon is a rare-type asteroid classified as near-Earth object of the Apollo group, approximately  in diameter. It was discovered by American astronomer Carolyn Shoemaker at Palomar Observatory on 29 May 1987. The asteroid was named after Poseidon from Greek mythology.

Orbit and classification 

Poseidon orbits the Sun at a distance of 0.6–3.1 AU once every 2 years and 6 months (908 days). Its orbit has an eccentricity of 0.68 and an inclination of 12° with respect to the ecliptic.

As no precoveries were taken, the asteroid's observation arc begins with its discovery in 1987. Poseidon may be associated with the Taurid Complex of meteor showers.

Naming 

This minor planet was named for the "God of the Sea", Poseidon, one of the Twelve Olympians in Greek mythology. He was also referred to as "Earth-Shaker" due to his role in provoking earthquakes, which were then thought to be caused by ocean waves beating on the shore. He was the brother of Zeus (see 5731 Zeus), and an enemy of the Trojans in the Trojan War. The  was published by the Minor Planet Center on 30 January 1991.

Physical characteristics 

In the SMASS classification, Poseidon is an O-type asteroid.

Diameter and albedo 

The Collaborative Asteroid Lightcurve Link assumes an albedo of 0.18 and derives a diameter of 2.32 kilometers with an absolute magnitude of 15.65. As of 2017, no other estimates for its diameter and albedo have been published.

Lightcurves 

In 1998, a rotational lightcurve of Poseidon was published from photometric observations made by Czech astronomer Petr Pravec at Ondřejov Observatory. It gave a period of  hours with a brightness variation of 0.08 magnitude.

A second lightcurve was obtained during the  Near-Earth Objects Follow-up Program which gave a concurring period of  hours and an amplitude of 0.07 magnitude. A low brightness variation typically indicates that the body has a nearly spheroidal shape.

References

External links 
 Asteroid Lightcurve Database (LCDB), query form (info )
 Dictionary of Minor Planet Names, Google books
 Asteroids and comets rotation curves, CdR – Observatoire de Genève, Raoul Behrend
 
 
 

004341
Discoveries by Carolyn S. Shoemaker
Named minor planets
004341
19870529